Azizabad (also Romanized as ‘Azīzābād) is a village in Itivand-e Shomali Rural District, Kakavand District, Delfan County, Lorestan Province, Iran. At the 2006 census, its population was 105, in 21 families.

References 

Towns and villages in Delfan County